The 1928 West Virginia gubernatorial election took place on November 6, 1928, to elect the governor of West Virginia. As of 2023 this is the last time a republican succeeded another republican as governor of West Virginia

Results

References

1928
gubernatorial
West Virginia
November 1928 events in the United States